Ellis Bluff is a rock bluff rising to  at the south side of the mouth of Logie Glacier, in the Cumulus Hills of Antarctica. It was named by the Advisory Committee on Antarctic Names for W. Ellis, a U.S. Navy chief air controlman during Operation Deepfreeze 1965 and 1966.

References 

Cliffs of the Ross Dependency
Dufek Coast